Mechi Highway (Nepali: मेची राजमार्ग) is a two-lane freeway in Eastern Nepal, spanning about 268 kilometers in length. The highway connects all the districts of Mechi zone, hence the name Mechi. It runs from the VDC of Kechana in Jhapa district in the south to the remote north of Taplejung through the district of Ilam. The main destinations along the highway include Prithivinagar, Bhadrapur,  Duhagadhi, Budhabare, Kanyam, and Phikkal. The highway shares a junction with Mahendra Highway at Charali.

See also
List of roads in Nepal
Koshi Highway
Sagarmatha Highway

References

Highways in Nepal